Single skating is a discipline of figure skating in which male and female skaters compete individually. Men's singles and women's singles are governed by the International Skating Union (ISU). Figure skating is the oldest winter sport contested at the Olympics, with men's and women's single skating appearing as two of the four figure skating events at the London Games in 1908.

Single skaters are required to perform two segments in all international competitions, the short program and the free skating program. Nathan Chen from the United States holds both the highest single men's short program and free skating scores; Russian skater Kamila Valieva holds the both highest single women's short program and free skating scores. Compulsory figures, from which the sport of figure skating gets its name, were a crucial part of the sport for most of its history until the ISU voted to remove them in 1990.

Single skating has required elements that skaters must perform during a competition and that make up a well-balanced skating program. They include jumps (and jump combinations), spins, step sequences, and choreographic sequences. The ISU defines a jump element as "an individual jump, a jump combination or a jump sequence". The six most common jumps can be divided into two groups: toe jumps (the toe loop, the flip, and the Lutz) and edge jumps (the Salchow, the loop, and the Axel). A jump combination, defined as "two (or more) jumps performed in immediate succession". There are three basic positions in spins: the camel, the sit spin, and the upright spin. Step sequences have been defined as "steps and turns in a pattern on the ice". A choreographic sequence, which occurs during the free skating program in singles skating, "consists of any kind of movements like steps, turns, spirals, arabesques, spread eagles, Ina Bauers, hydroblading, any jumps with maximum of 2 revolutions, spins, etc.".

The required elements must be performed in specific ways, as described by published communications by the ISU, unless otherwise specified. The ISU publishes violations and their points values yearly. Deductions in singles skating include violations in time, music, and clothing. The ISU also describes regulations regarding falls and interruptions.

History

The first international figure skating competition was in Vienna in 1882. Skaters were required to perform 23 compulsory figures, as well as a four-minute free skating program, and a section called "special figures", in which they had to perform moves or combinations of moves that highlighted their advanced skills. The first World Championships, hosted by the newly formed International Skating Union (ISU), occurred in 1896, and consisted of four competitors, all men. Figure skating is the oldest winter sport contested at the Olympics, starting at the London Games in 1908.

Competition segments

Short program

The short program is the first segment of single skating, pair skating, and synchronized skating in international competitions, including all ISU championships. The short program must be skated before the free skate, the second component in competitions. The short program lasts, for both senior and junior singles and pairs, two minutes and 40 seconds. Music with lyrics has been allowed in single skating and in all disciplines since the 2014–2015 season.

Nathan Chen from the United States holds the highest single men's short program score of 113.97 points, which he earned at the 2022 Beijing Olympics. Russian skater Kamila Valieva holds the highest single women's short program score of 90.45 points, which she earned at the 2022 European Figure Skating Championship in Tallinn, Estonia.

Both male and female senior single skaters must perform seven elements in their short program. They both must include a double or triple Axel; one triple jump; a jump combination consisting of either a double jump and a triple jump, or two triple jumps; a spin combination with just one change of foot; and a step sequence using the entire ice surface. Additionally, men may substitute the one triple jump for a quadruple jump; have a quadruple jump as part of their jump combination; and must also have a camel spin or sit spin with just one change of foot. Women must also have either a layback or sideways leaning spin or a sit or camel spin without a change of foot. Junior single skaters also have seven required elements. Junior men and women single skaters are not allowed to perform quadruple jumps in their short programs, and junior women single skaters cannot include triple Axels in both their short and free skating programs.

Free skating

Free skating, also called the free skate or long program, is the second segment in single skating, pair skating, and synchronized skating. Its duration, across all disciplines, is four minutes for senior skaters and teams, and three-and-one-half minutes for junior skaters. American skater Nathan Chen holds the highest single men's free skating program score of 224.92 points, which he earned at the 2020 ISU Grand Prix Final. Kamila Valieva from Russia holds the highest single women's free skating score of 185.29 points, which she earned at 2021 Rostelecom Cup.

According to the ISU, free skating "consists of a well balanced program of Free Skating elements, such as jumps, spins, steps and other linking movements". A well-balanced free skate for both senior men and women single skaters must consist of the following: up to seven jump elements, one of which has to be an Axel jump; up to three spins, one of which has to be a spin combination (one a spin with just one position, and one flying spin with a flying entrance); only one step sequence; and only one choreographic sequence. A well-balanced free skate for junior men and junior women single skaters must consist of the same requirements for senior skaters but with the exception of the step sequence requirement.

Compulsory figures

Compulsory figures, also called school figures, are the "circular patterns which skaters trace on the ice to demonstrate skill in placing clean turns evenly on round circles". Until 1947, for approximately the first half of the existence of figure skating as a sport, compulsory figures made up 60 percent of the total score at most competitions around the world. After World War II, the number of figures skaters had to perform during competitions decreased, and after 1968, they began to be progressively devalued, until the ISU voted to remove them from all international competitions in 1990. Despite the apparent demise of compulsory figures from the sport of figure skating, coaches continued to teach figures and skaters continued to practice them because figures gave skaters an advantage in developing alignment, core strength, body control, and discipline. Championships and festivals focusing on compulsory figures have occurred since 2015.

Competition requirements

Jumps

The ISU defines a jump element as "an individual jump, a jump combination or a jump sequence". The six most common jumps can be divided into two groups: toe jumps (the toe loop, the flip, and the Lutz) and edge jumps (the Salchow, the loop, and the Axel). Jumps must have the following characteristics to earn the most points, according to the ISU: they must have "very good height and very good length"; they must be executed effortlessly, including the rhythm demonstrated during jump combinations; and they must have good take-offs and landings. The following are not required, but also taken into consideration: there must be steps executed before the beginning of the jump, or it must have either a creative or unexpected entry; the jump must match the music; and the skater must have, from the jump's take-off to its landing, a "very good body position". Somersault-type jumps, like the back flip, are not allowed. The back flip has been banned by the ISU since 1976 because it was deemed too dangerous and lacked "aesthetic value".

A jump combination, defined as "two (or more) jumps performed in immediate succession", is executed when a skater's landing foot of the first jump is also the take-off foot of the following jump. If a skater executes one complete revolution between the jumps, the element is still a combination. The free foot can touch the ice, but there must be no weight transfer on it. The skater can also perform an Euler between jumps. If the first jump of a two-jump combination is not completed successfully, it is still counted as a jump combination. A jump sequence is executed when a skater completes two or three jumps, with no limits on the number of revolutions. The first jump, which can be any type allowed by the ISU; the second and/or third jumps must be an Axel-type jump "with a direct step from the landing curve of the first jump to the take-off curve" of the Axel. Skaters can also complete one full revolution on the ice between the jumps and their free foot can touch the ice, although without transferring their weight onto it.

All jumps are considered in the order that they are completed. If an extra jump or jumps are completed, only the first jump will be counted; jumps done later in the program will have no value. The limitation on the number of jumps skaters can perform in their programs, called the "Zayak Rule" after American skater Elaine Zayak, whom TV sports producer David Michaels called a true transitional figure who changed everything" because of her jumping skills, has been in effect since 1983, after Zayak performed six triple jumps, four toe loop jumps, and two Salchows in her free skating program at the 1982 World Championships. Writer Ellyn Kestnbaum stated that the ISU established the rule "in order to encourage variety and balance rather than allowing a skater to rack up credit for demonstrating the same skill over and over". Sports writer Dvora Meyers calls the rule change "an institutional response" because it was made even though male skaters had also performed repetitive jumps in the same program during the same time period. Kestnbaum also stated that as rotations in jumps for both men and women have increased, skaters have increased the difficulty of jumps by adding more difficult combinations and by adding difficult steps immediately before or after their jumps, resulting in "integrating the jumps more seamlessly into the flow of the program".

In both the short program and free skating, any jump, jump combination, or jump sequence begun during the second half of the program earns extra points "in order to give credit for even distribution of difficulties in the program". As of the 2018–2019 season, however, only the last jump element performed during the short program and the final three jump elements performed during the free skate, counted in a skater's final score. International Skating Magazine called this regulation the "Zagitova Rule", named for Russian skater Alina Zagitova, who won the gold medal at the 2018 Winter Olympics by "backloading" her free skating program. She placed all her jumps in the second half of the program in order to take advantage of the rule in place at the time that awarded a 10% bonus to jumps performed during the second half of the program. Also starting in 2018, single skaters could only repeat the same two triple or quadruple jumps in their free skating programs. They could repeat four-revolution jumps only once, and the base value of the triple Axel and quadruple jumps were "reduced dramatically". As of 2022, jump sequences consisted of two or three jumps, but the second or third jump had to be an Axel. Jump sequences began to be counted for their full value and skaters could include single jumps in their step sequences as choreographic elements without incurring a penalty.

Spins

There are three basic positions in spins: the camel, the sit spin, and the upright spin. Spins must have the following characteristics to earn the most points: spins must have good speed and/or acceleration; they must be executed effortlessly; and they must have good control and clear position(s), even for flying spins, which must have a good amount of height and air/landing position. Also important but not required are the following characteristics: the spin must maintain a center; the spin must be original and creative; and the element must match the music. The New York Times says, when comparing spins and the more exciting jumps for single skaters, "While jumps look like sport, spins look more like art. While jumps provide the suspense, spins provide the scenery, but there is so much more to the scenery than most viewers have time or means to grasp".

If a skater performs a spin that has no basic position with only two revolutions, or with less than two revolutions, they do not fulfill the position requirement for the spin and receives no points for it. A spin with less than three revolutions is not considered a spin; rather, it is considered a skating movement. The flying spin and any spin that only has one position must have six revolutions; spin combinations must have 10 revolutions. Required revolutions are counted from when the skater enters the spin until they exit out of it, except for flying spins and the spins in which the final wind-up is in one position. Skaters increase the difficulty of camel spins by grabbing their leg or blade while performing the spin.

A skater earns points for a spin change of edge only if they complete the spin in a basic position. Fluctuations in speed and variations in the positions of a skater's arms, head, and free leg are permitted. A skater must execute at least three revolutions before and after a change of foot. If a skater tries to perform a spin and their change of foot is too far apart (thus creating two spins instead of one), only the part executed before the change of foot is included in the skater's score. The change of foot is optional for spin combinations and for single-position spins. If they fall while entering a spin, or while executing any failed spin, the skater can fill the time lost by executing a spin or spinning movement immediately after the fall or failed spin; however, this movement will not be counted as an element. If the spinning centers, which should occur before and after the change of foot, are too far apart "and the criteria of 'two spins' is fulfilled (there is a curve of exit after the first part and the curve of entry into the second part)", only the part of the spin before the skater's change of foot will be counted.

A spin combination must have at least "two different basic positions" and each position must have two revolutions, anywhere within the spin. Skaters earn the full value of a spin combination when they include all three basic positions. The number of revolutions in non-basic positions is included in the total number of revolutions, but changing to a non-basic position is not considered a change of position. The change of foot and change of position can be made at the same time or separately and can be performed as a jump or as a step-over movement. Non-basic positions are allowed during spins executed in one position or, for single skaters, during a flying spin.

Single skaters earn more points for performing difficult entrances into and exits out of their spins. An entrance is defined as "the preparation immediately preceding a spin", and can include the spin's beginning phase. All entrances must have a "significant impact" on the spin's execution, balance, and control, and must be completed on the first spinning foot. The intended spin position must be achieved within the skater's first two revolutions and can be non-basic in spin combinations only. A regular backward entry is not considered a difficult entry. An exit is defined as "the last phase of the spin" and includes the phase immediately performed after the spin. A difficult exit is defined as any jump or movement that makes the exit significantly more difficult. It can include the phase immediately following the spin and must have a "significant impact" on the spin's execution, balance, and control. There are 11 categories of difficult solo spin variations.

Step sequences

Step sequences have been defined as "steps and turns in a pattern on the ice". The ISU requires that all step sequences are performed "according to the character of the music". A step sequence must have the following characteristics to earn the most points: the sequence must match the music; it must be performed effortlessly throughout the sequence, and have good energy, flow, and execution; and it must have deep edges and clean turns and steps. Also important but not required are the following characteristics: a sequence must have originality and creativity; the skater must have "excellent commitment and control" of his or her entire body; and the skater must have good acceleration and deceleration during the sequence. As of 2022, skaters could include single jumps as choreographic elements into their step sequences without incurring a penalty. 

Skaters can make short stops during a step sequence, but they must be performed in accordance with the music. Skaters must also perform steps and turns that are balanced throughout the sequence, which includes turning in all directions, the use of both feet, and up and down movements. Skaters can choose any kind of step sequence they wish, and can include jumps, but they must fully use the ice surface. If a step sequence is barely visible or too short, it does not fulfill step sequence requirements. As of 2022, junior skaters were no longer required to perform a step sequence during their free skate programs; instead, they had to include a choreographic sequence because ISU officials wanted them to focus more on their program components.

Choreographic sequences

According to the ISU, a choreographic sequence, which occurs during the free skating program in singles skating, "consists of at least two different movements like steps, turns, spirals, arabesques, spread eagles, Ina Bauers, hydroblading, any jumps with maximum of 2 revolutions, spins, etc.". Skaters can use steps and turns to connect the two or more movements together. Judges do not evaluate individual elements in a choreographic segment; rather, they note that it was accomplished. For example, any spin or any single and double jumps included in a choreographic sequence are not included in the final score. If a skater performs a jump with more than two revolutions, the sequence is considered ended. There are no restrictions, but the sequence must be clearly visible.The technical panel identifies when a choreographic sequence begins, at its first movement, and ends, which occurs when the skater prepares to perform the next element if it is not the last element of the program. It can be executed before or after the step sequence.

Single skaters must include the following in order to earn the highest points possible during a choreographic sequence: it must have originality and creativity, the sequence must match the music; and their performance must be effortless throughout the entire sequence, with good energy, execution, and flow. They must also have the following: good precision and clarity; skaters must use the entire ice surface; and skaters must demonstrate "excellent commitment" and control of their whole body while performing their choreographic sequences.

Rules and regulations
Skaters must only execute the prescribed elements; if they do not, the extra or unprescribed elements will not be counted in their score. Only the first attempt of an element will be included. The ISU published a judges' handbook describing what judges needed to look for during men's and women's single skating competitions in 1965. Violations in single skating include time, music, clothing, and falls and interruptions.

Time
Judges penalize single junior and senior skaters one point up to every five seconds for ending their programs too early or too late. If they start their programs between one and 30 seconds late, they can lose one point. Skaters are allowed complete their short programs and free skates within plus or minus 10 seconds of the required times; if they cannot, judges can deduct points if they finish up to five seconds too early or too late. If they begin skating any element after their required time (plus the required 10 seconds they have to begin), they earn no points for those elements. If the program's duration is 30 or more seconds under the required time range, skaters will receive no marks.

Music
All programs must be skated to music of the competitor's choosing. The use of music with lyrics was expanded to singles skating, as well as to pair skating, starting in 2014; the first Olympics affected by this change was in 2018 in PyeongChang, South Korea. The ISU's decision, done to increase the sport's audience, to encourage more participation, and to give skaters and choreographers more choice in constructing their programs, had divided support among skaters, coaches, and choreographers. The first senior singles skater who used music with lyrics during a major international competition was Artur Gachinski from Russia, during his short program at Skate America in 2014.

Clothing

The clothing worn by single skaters at ISU Championships, the Olympics, and international competitions must be "modest, dignified and appropriate for athletic competition—not garish or theatrical in design". Props and accessories are not allowed. Clothing can reflect the character of the skaters' chosen music and must not "give the effect of excessive nudity inappropriate for the discipline".

All men must wear full-length trousers, a rule that has been in effect since the 1994–1995 season. Since 1988, the ISU required that women skaters wear skirts during competition, a rule dubbed "the Katarina Rule", after East German skater Katarina Witt, who "skated her tapdance-based short program in a showgirl-style light blue sequined leotard with high-cut legs, low-cut chest, and similarly colored feathers on her headdress and sleeves and around the hips as the only perfunctionary gesture in the way of a skirt". Decorations on costumes must be "non-detachable"; judges can deduct one point per program if part of the competitors' costumes or decorations fall on the ice. If there is a costume or prop violation, the judges can deduct one point per program.

If competitors do not adhere to these guidelines, they "will be penalized by a deduction". However, costume deductions are rare. Juliet Newcomer from U.S. Figure Skating states that by the time skaters get to a national or world championship, they have received enough feedback about their costumes and are no longer willing to take any more risks of losing points. Former competitive skater and designer Braden Overett told the New York Post that there is "an informal review process before major competitions such as the Olympics, during which judges communicate their preferences".

Also according to the New York Post, one of the goals of skaters and designers is to ensure that a costume's design, which can "make or break a performance", does not affect the skaters' scores. Former competitive skater and fashion writer Shalayne Pulia states that figure skating costume designers are part of a skater's "support team". Designers collaborate with skaters and their coaches to help them design costumes that fit the themes and requirements of their programs for months before the start of each season. There have been calls to require figure skaters to wear uniforms like other competitive sports, in order to make the sport less expensive and more inclusive, and to emphasize its athletic side.

Falls and interruptions
The ISU defines a fall as the "loss of control by a Skater with the result that the majority of his/her own body weight is on the ice supported by any other part of the body other than the blades; e.g. hand(s), knee(s), back, buttock(s) or any part of the arm". For senior single skaters, one point is deducted for the first and second fall, two points are deducted for the third and fourth fall, and three points are deducted for the fifth fall and any falls after that. Junior single skaters are penalized one point for every fall.

The Boston Globe and other media outlets stated that, as of 2018, the ISU Judging System (IJS) was structured to reward difficult elements, so skaters earned more points despite falling on multi-rotational, complicated jumps than their competitors who skated "clean" programs with less difficult elements and did not lose points from falling. According to former American figure skater Katrina Hacker, falls during jumps occur for the following reasons: the skater makes an error during their takeoff; their jump is under-rotated, or not fully rotated while the skater is in the air; they execute a tilted jump and is unable to land upright on their feet; and they make an error during the first jump of a combination jump, resulting in not having enough smoothness, speed, and flow to complete the second jump.

Injuries to the lower body (the knee, ankle, and back) are the most common for both single skaters and ice dancers. Single skaters experience 0.97 injuries per athlete, over the course of their careers.  Single skaters also tend to have more injuries caused by chronic overuse of their lower limbs or backs. Researchers Jason Vescovi and Jaci VanHeest state that 50–75% of injuries can be prevented because they are caused from "training and/or performance issues".

If there is an interruption while performing their program, skaters can lose one point if it lasts more than 10 seconds but not over 20 seconds. They can lose two points if the interruption lasts 20 seconds but not over 30 seconds, and three points if it lasts 30 seconds but not more than 40 seconds. They can lose five points if they do not resume their program until three minutes after the interruption begins. They can also lose five points if the interruption is caused by an "adverse condition" up to three minutes before the start of their program.

If the quality or tempo of the music the skater is using in their program is deficient, or if there is a stop or interruption in their music, no matter the reason, they must stop skating when they become aware of the problem or when signaled to stop by a skating official, whichever occurs first. If any problems with the music happen within 20 seconds after they have begun their program, the skater can choose to either restart their program or to continue from the point where they have stopped performing. If they decide to continue from the point where they stopped, they are continued to happen at that point onward, as well as their performance up to that point. If they decide to restart their program, they are judged from the beginning of their restart and what they had done previously must be disregarded. If the music interruption occurs more than 20 seconds after they have begun their program, or if it occurred during an element or at the entrance of an element, they must resume their program from the point of the interruption. If the element was identified before the interruption, the element must be deleted from the list of performed elements, and the skater is allowed to repeat the element when they resume their program. No deductions are counted for interruptions due to music deficiencies.

Notes

References

Works cited
 Hines, James R. (2011). Historical Dictionary of Figure Skating. Lanham, Maryland: Scarecrow Press. .
 Kestnbaum, Ellyn (2003). Culture on Ice: Figure Skating and Cultural Meaning. Middletown, Connecticut: Wesleyan University Press. .
 "Special Regulations & Technical Rules Single & Pair Skating and Ice Dance 2021". Lausanne, Switzerland: International Skating Union. June 2021. Retrieved 9 August 2022 (S&P/ID 2021).
 "Special Regulaions & Technical Rules Synchronized Skating 2021". Lausanne, Switzerland: International Skating Union. June 2021. Retrieved 9 August 2022 (SS 2021).
 "Technical Panel Handbook: Single Skating 2020/2021" (PDF). ISU Judging System. International Skating Union. 20 July 2020. Retrieved 29 July 2020 (Tech panel).
 Vescovi, Jason D.; VanHeest, Jaci L. (2018). "Epidemiology of Injury in Figure Skating". In Vescovi, Jason D.; VanHeest, Jaci L. The Science of Figure Skating. New York: Routledge. pp. 35–41. .

External links 
 Surya Bonaly's backflip, landing on one foot, and triple Salchow

 
Figure skating disciplines